The Telltale Knife is a 1914 American short silent Western film starring  Tom Mix and directed by William Duncan.

Cast
 Tom Mix as Tom Mason
 Charles Tipton
 William Duncan
 Myrtle Stedman
 Rex De Rosselli

See also
 Hoot Gibson filmography

References

External links
 

1914 films
1914 short films
1914 Western (genre) films
American silent short films
American black-and-white films
Selig Polyscope Company films
Silent American Western (genre) films
Films directed by William Duncan
1910s American films